Vieljeux Prestige Mboungou (born 10 July 2000) is a Congolese professional footballer who plays as a winger for Ajman and the Congo national football team.

Club career
Best known as Prestige Mboungou, he was born in the capital Brazzaville, and he started his senior career at CARA Brazzaville in 2016 where he spent 2 seasons. Next, he played one season with CSMD Diables Noirs in 2018, making a total of 3 consecutive seasons in the Congo Premier League. It is in summer 2018, after winning the Coupe du Congo that he moved abroad and signed with Czech lower-league club MFK Vyškov. In spring of 2019 he moves to the United States to play on loan with Charlotte Independence but his stay is short and by summer he was back in Europe. Unsatisfied with the lack of opportunities, the player and MFK Vyškov agree to terminate the contract. As free player, Mboungou passes trials and signs a two-and-a-half years contract with Serbian second-tier club FK Metalac Gornji Milanovac, who is at that moment second in the table with good perspectives of getting promotion to SuperLiga for the next season.

On June 2, 2020, Mbongou renewed his contract to one more year with Metalac.

On 6 August 2021, Mboungou joined Saudi club Abha. On 31 January 2022, he was loaned out to former club Metalac with an option to buy.

On 29 August 2022, Mboungou joined Emirati club Ajman.

International career
At youth level, Mboungou was part of the Congolese U-17 squad since very early, having scored the second goal in the 3–0 victory over Namibia played home at August 21, 2016, for the 2017 Africa U-17 Cup of Nations qualifiers. Then, he was part of the Congolese U-20 squad in the 2019 Africa U-20 Cup of Nations qualifiers game against Senegal, a 2–2 home draw, having scored the first goal at 6 minutes of game.

Being his name, Prestige, correspondent to his performances and with the status the Congolese clubs he represented enjoyed domestically, Mboungou debuted for the Congolese main national team already in 2017 being just 16 at the time. His international debut was in a 2–0 home loss to Senegal in a friendly game played on January 11, that year. He entered as substitute replacing Kessel Tsiba after 58 minutes of game.

After that friendly game, Mboungou was selected to the Congo team that played in the 2018 African Nations Championship in which Congo reached the quarter-finals and in which Mboungou was a regular starter in all games.

International statistics

Honours
Diables Noirs
 Coupe du Congo: 2018

References

External links
 Prestige Mboungou at CAF

2000 births
Living people
Sportspeople from Brazzaville
Republic of the Congo footballers
Republic of the Congo expatriate footballers
Republic of the Congo international footballers
Association football wingers
CARA Brazzaville players
CSMD Diables Noirs players
MFK Vyškov players
Charlotte Independence players
FK Metalac Gornji Milanovac players
Abha Club players
Ajman Club players
Serbian First League players
Saudi Professional League players
UAE Pro League players
Expatriate footballers in the Czech Republic
Expatriate soccer players in the United States
Expatriate footballers in Serbia
Expatriate footballers in Saudi Arabia
Expatriate footballers in the United Arab Emirates
Republic of the Congo expatriate sportspeople in the Czech Republic
Republic of the Congo expatriate sportspeople in the United States
Republic of the Congo expatriate sportspeople in Saudi Arabia
Republic of the Congo youth international footballers
Republic of the Congo under-20 international footballers
Republic of the Congo A' international footballers
2018 African Nations Championship players
Republic of the Congo expatriate sportspeople in Serbia